Brian Bird is an American film and television writer and producer. He is best known for his work on Touched by an Angel, Not Easily Broken, Jamaa, Captive and The Case for Christ. He is also known as an executive producer and co-creator of the Hallmark Channel original series, When Calls the Heart.

Life and career
Brian was born in Kewanee, Illinois. He then attended California State University, Fullerton, graduating with a bachelor's degree in journalism. Later, he worked for the San Gabriel Valley Tribune, World Vision magazine and Christianity Today. In 1984, he wrote his first screenplay for the TV Series, Fantasy Island.

Brian is the co-founder, along with Michael Landon, Jr., of Believe Pictures.

Filmography

Publications 
 2018 - When God Calls the Heart 
 2018 - When God Calls the Heart at Christmas 
 2019 - When God Calls the Heart to Love

Awards and nominations

References

External links
 
 

Living people
American film producers
American male screenwriters
American television producers
American television writers
American male television writers
Year of birth missing (living people)